Buckhead Village is a neighborhood of Atlanta, Georgia, one of 42 neighborhoods in the larger Buckhead district and the community's historic business section. The Village as defined by the city as the area between Piedmont Road, Peachtree Road, and Pharr Road.

History
In 1838, Henry Irby purchased 202 1/2 acres surrounding what is now Buckhead Village from Daniel Johnson for $650. Irby subsequently established a general store and tavern at the northwest corner of the Peachtree/Roswell/Paces Ferry intersection. The name "Buckhead" comes from a story that Irby killed a large buck deer and placed the head in a prominent location. Prior to this, the settlement had been called "Irbyville."

The surrounding area, which is now the larger Buckhead community, remained dominated by country estates until after World War I, when many of Atlanta's wealthy began building mansions among the area's rolling hills. The area that is now the Buckhead district was annexed by Atlanta in 1952, following an earlier attempt by Mayor William B. Hartsfield in 1946 that was voted down by residents. In 1956, an estate known as Joyeuse was chosen as the site for a major shopping center to be known as Lenox Square, starting the development of Peachtree Road as a major commercial, financial, and high-rise residential corridor.

To reverse a downturn in the Village during the 1980s, minimum parking spot requirements for bars were lifted, which quickly led to it becoming the most dense concentration of bars and clubs in the city. These establishments included BAR, World Bar, Lulu's Bait Shack, Mako's, Clarence Foster's, Tongue & Groove, Chaos and John Harvard's Brew House. By 1996, Buckhead Village nightlife was comparable to "Mardi Gras, complete with nightly arrests, puking in the streets and [drunk] college girls."

In the late 1990s illegal cruising on Peachtree Road became rampant, making crime harder to spot and the shortage of police officers more apparent. Violent crime increased, culminating with two murders on Super Bowl Sunday in 2000.  Baltimore Ravens football player Ray Lewis was implicated in the murders which occurred after he left the Cobalt Club at 265 East Paces Ferry Road.  Lewis pleaded guilty to misdemeanor obstructing justice charges and his two co-defendants were found not guilty.

Buckhead Alliance founder Robin Loudermilk claimed that there were at least ten murders during this period related to the nightlife in the Village. Beginning in 2000, residents sought to ameliorate this situation by taking measures to reduce the community's nightlife and re-establish a more residential character. The Buckhead Coalition and councilwoman Mary Norwood were instrumental in persuading the Atlanta City Council to pass an ordinance to close bars at 2:30 a.m., rather than 4 a.m., and liquor licenses were made more difficult to obtain. Eventually, most of the Buckhead Village nightlife area was acquired for the Streets of Buckhead multi-use project and many of the former bars and clubs were torn down in 2007.

Parks
 Charlie Loudermilk Park: In the triangle formed by Peachtree Road, and Roswell Road, is a triangular park known as Charlie Loudermilk Park (renamed from Triangle Park in 2009). Located within the park is The Storyteller, by sculptor Frank Fleming, depicting a man with a buck's head telling a story to various other animals. The descriptive plaque explains:Local lore has recorded that in 1838 a hunter hung a deer's head at about this location in front of Irby's Tavern. The Henry Irby Family owned 803 surrounding acres and the area was designated Irbyville on maps at that time. People started identifying the area by the buck's head and the community then changed its name to Buckhead... The storyteller is sharing this information with its circle of small animal friends.

Community organizations
The key organizations organizing neighborhoods businesses and residents and working for improvements are the Buckhead Community Improvement District (CID), the Buckhead Area Transportation Management Association (BATMA), the Buckhead Business Association (BBA) and Neighborhood Planning Unit (NPU) B. These organizations backed a new zoning ordinance that the Atlanta City Council adopted on October 4, 2010 that expanded the SPI-9 zoning area from a small area immediately around and southwest of the intersection of Peachtree and Paces Ferry, to cover a much larger commercial area west of Piedmont Ave. and north of Pharr Rd. The stated aim of the community organizations is to create in the Village a "walkable, urban community enriched with public art and parks, wide sidewalks, greenspace, transportation options, and outdoor dining, all designed to have international appeal." As of May 2011, there are plans for a $4 million streetscape program aims to improve the experience for pedestrians in the Village. The program is funded by private donations, CID funding, and a grant from the Woodruff Foundation. While the Streets of Buckhead project went on hold, other developments were moving forward around Peachtree Rd. and Roswell Rd, and so the CID will first improve pedestrian amenities around that area. Completion is targeted for mid-2012.

References

Neighborhoods in Atlanta